Governor Cathcart may refer to:

Charles Cathcart, 2nd Earl Cathcart (1783–1859), Governor General of the Province of Canada and Lieutenant Governor of Canada West from 1845 to 1847
George Cathcart (1794–1854), Governor of the Cape Colony from 1852 to 1853